Olodio is a town in southwestern Ivory Coast. It is a sub-prefecture of Tabou Department in San-Pédro Region, Bas-Sassandra District. The town is 10 kilometres east of the border with Liberia.

Olodio was a commune until March 2012, when it became one of 1126 communes nationwide that were abolished.

In 2014, the population of the sub-prefecture of Olodio was 15,824.

Villages
The twenty six villages of the sub-prefecture of Olodio and their population in 2014 are:

References

Sub-prefectures of San-Pédro Region
Former communes of Ivory Coast